The big-scaled dwarf gecko, big-scaled least gecko, or cotton ginner (Sphaerodactylus grandisquamis) is a species of lizard in the family Sphaerodactylidae. It is endemic to  Puerto Rico. Sphaerodactylus grandisquamis was formerly a subspecies of Sphaerodactylus macrolepis but was elevated to full species status using a combination of molecular and morphological data. Sphaerodactylus g. phoberus is no longer considered valid and was synonymized with S. g. grandiquamis.

References

Sphaerodactylus
Reptiles of Puerto Rico
Endemic fauna of Puerto Rico
Reptiles described in 1904
Taxa named by Leonhard Stejneger